The Commander of the Royal Netherlands Navy (CZsk) is the highest-ranking officer of the Royal Netherlands Navy. The CZsk reports directly to the Chief of the Netherlands Defence Staff.

The position of CZsk was created on 5 September 2005, following a large overhaul of the command structure of the Dutch armed forces. In this overhaul the position of Bevelhebber der Zeestrijdkrachten was dropped and the position of Commander of the Naval Force in The Netherlands was upgraded to the current CZsk position. Ever since the integration of the Royal Netherlands Marine Corps into the Navy, the former Commander of the Marine Corps has held the position of Deputy Commander of the Royal Netherlands Navy. 

In addition to being the commanding officer of the Dutch Navy, under the terms of the BENESAM Treaty the CZsk is also the Admiral of the Benelux (the commanding officer of the integrated command of the Dutch and Belgian fleets). This means the CZsk is the commanding officer of the operational units of the Royal Netherlands Navy and the Belgian Naval Component.
Also, the CZsk shares command responsibility with the Chief of the Netherlands Defence Staff for units that have been deployed on international missions (under the colors of the United Nations).

The position of CZsk is statutorily held by a Vice Admiral or Lieutenant General of the Marines (NATO OF-8). The current CZsk is Vice-Admiral Rene Tas, who succeeded Vice Admiral Rob Kramer in the position in September 2021.

Units
The Commander of the Royal Dutch Navy is Director of four Directorates: 

 Directorate Planning & Control
 Directorate Operational Support
 Directorate of Operations 
 Directorate of the Caribbean

List of officeholders

Commander of the naval forces
 1939 - 1945 Lieutenant Admiral J. Th. Fürstner
 1945 - 1948 Lieutenant Admiral C.E.L. Helfrich
 1948 - 1951 Vice Admiral E.J. van Holthe
 1951 - 1956 Vice Admiral A. de Booy
 1956 - 1956 Vice Admiral F.T. Burghard
 1956 - 1959 Vice Admiral H.H.L. Pröpper
 1959 - 1963 Vice Admiral L. Brouwer
 1963 - 1967 Vice Admiral A.H.J. van der Schatte Olivier
 1967 - 1968 Vice Admiral H.M. van den Wall Bake
 1968 - 1972 Vice Admiral J.B.M.J. Maas
 1972 - 1975 Vice Admiral E. Roest
 1976 - 1979 Vice Admiral B. Veldkamp
 1979 - 1982 Vice Admiral H.L. van Beek
 1982 - 1985 Vice Admiral J.H.B. Hulshof
 1985 - 1989 Vice Admiral C.H.E. Brainich von Brainich Felth
 1989 - 1992 Vice Admiral jhr. H. van Foreest
 1992 - 1995 Vice Admiral N.W.G. Buis
 1995 - 1998 Vice Admiral L. Kroon
 1998 - 2003 Vice Admiral C. van Duyvendijk
 2003 - 2005 Vice Admiral R.A.A. Klaver

Commander of the Royal Netherlands Navy

Deputy commander of the Royal Netherlands Navy
Major General of the Marines Rob Zuiderwijk (5 September 2005 – 27 August 2007)
Rear Admiral Wim Nagtegaal (27 August 2007 – 13 January 2010)
Major General of the Marines Ton van Ede (13 January 2010 – 9 April 2012)
Major General of the Marines Rob Verkerk (9 April 2012 – 26 September 2014)
Rear Admiral Ben Bekkering (26 September 2014 – 27 May 2016)
Rear Admiral Rob Kramer (27 May 2016-11 September 2017)
Major General of the marines Frank van Sprang (11 September 2017-11 November 2019)
Rear Admiral Huub Hulsker (11 November 2019-present)

See also
 Commander of the Royal Netherlands Army
 Commander of the Royal Netherlands Air Force

References 

 
Netherlands
Military ranks of the Royal Netherlands Navy